Mills County is a county located in the U.S. state of Iowa. As of the 2020 census, the population was 14,484. The county seat is Glenwood. The county was formed in 1851 and named for Major Frederick Mills of Burlington, Iowa who was killed at the Battle of Churubusco during the Mexican–American War.

Mills County is included in the Omaha–Council Bluffs, NE–IA Metropolitan Statistical Area.

History
The future county's first permanent settlement was Rushville, founded in 1846 by persecuted members of the Church of Jesus Christ of Latter-day Saints as they were being driven out of Nauvoo, Illinois. This is not to be confused with the state's present-day Rushville in Jasper County. A nearby settlement, also founded by the Mormon settlers, was called Coonsville after Dr. Liberius Coons, one of the first arrivals. That settlement continued after the Mormons moved on; its name was changed to Glenwood in 1853.

In Glenwood, the first courthouse was a small frame building which served until 1857. It was replaced by a two-story building, which was enlarged in the 1900s and received a clock tower in 1910. In 1959 this building was replaced with the present building, dedicated on August 29, 1959.

Geography

Major highways
  Interstate 29
  U.S. Highway 34
  U.S. Highway 59
  U.S. Highway 275

Adjacent counties
 Pottawattamie County (north)
 Montgomery County (east)
 Fremont County (south)
 Cass County, Nebraska (southwest)
 Sarpy County, Nebraska (west)

Demographics

2020 census
There were 6,110 housing units, of which 5,512 were occupied.

2010 census
There were 6,109 housing units, of which 5,605 were occupied.

2000 census

As of the census of 2000, there were 14,547 people, 5,324 households, and 3,939 families residing in the county. The population density was 33 people per square mile (13/km2). There were 5,671 housing units at an average density of 13 per square mile (5/km2). The racial makeup of the county was 97.97% White, 0.28% Black or African American, 0.27% Native American, 0.29% Asian, 0.01% Pacific Islander, 0.36% from other races, and 0.82% from two or more races. 1.23% of the population were Hispanic or Latino of any race.

There were 5,324 households, out of which 34.80% had children under the age of 18 living with them, 61.70% were married couples living together, 8.90% had a female householder with no husband present, and 26.00% were non-families. 22.30% of all households were made up of individuals, and 10.10% had someone living alone who was 65 years of age or older. The average household size was 2.60 and the average family size was 3.04.

In the county, the population was spread out, with 26.80% under the age of 18, 7.00% from 18 to 24, 28.10% from 25 to 44, 25.50% from 45 to 64, and 12.60% who were 65 years of age or older. The median age was 38 years. For every 100 females there were 100.60 males. For every 100 females age 18 and over, there were 96.70 males.

The median income for a household in the county was $42,428, and the median income for a family was $49,592. Males had a median income of $31,721 versus $24,938 for females. The per capita income for the county was $18,736. About 5.80% of families and 8.30% of the population were below the poverty line, including 10.30% of those under age 18 and 7.60% of those age 65 or over.

Communities

Cities

 Emerson
 Glenwood
 Hastings
 Henderson
 Malvern
 Pacific Junction
 Silver City
 Tabor (partial)

Unincorporated communities
 Rushville

Census-designated place
 Mineola

Townships

 Anderson
 Center
 Deer Creek
 Glenwood
 Indian Creek
 Ingraham
 Lyons
 Oak
 Plattville
 Rawles
 St. Marys
 Silver Creek
 White Cloud

Population ranking
The population ranking of the following table is based on the 2020 census of Mills County.

† county seat

Law enforcement
The current Sheriff of Mills County is Eugene Goos.  He and his 11 full-time deputies patrol approximately 447 square miles in the county.  The Mills County Sheriff's Office provides police services under contract for all of the towns and cities and Mills County except for the City of Glenwood which has its own police department.

The first Mills County Sheriff was W.W. Noyes who was appointed by the Iowa General Assembly on August 1, 1851.  He was succeeded by James Hardy who served as the first elected sheriff of the county and assumed the office on August 31, 1851.

Politics

See also

 National Register of Historic Places listings in Mills County, Iowa

References

External links

 Official Mills County Government website
 Mills County Conservation Board website
 Mills County Public Health website
 Official Twitter Page

 
1851 establishments in Iowa
Iowa counties on the Missouri River
Populated places established in 1851